Ryan's World (formerly Ryan ToysReview) is a children's YouTube channel for children aged 2–6 featuring Ryan Kaji along with his mother (Loann Kaji), father (Shion Kaji), and twin sisters (Emma and Kate).

The channel usually releases a new video daily. One of the channel's videos, titled Huge Eggs Surprise Toys Challenge has over 2 billion views as of January 2023, making it one of the 60 most-viewed videos on YouTube. As of January 2023, the channel has over 34 million subscribers and over 45 billion views. The channel is one of the Top 10 most-subscribed YouTube channels in the United States.

The Verge has described the channel as "a mash-up of personal vlog and 'unboxing' video, a blend of innocent childhood antics and relentless, often overwhelming consumerism." According to Forbes, Kaji earned $11 million between 2016 and 2017 as the eighth highest-paid YouTuber, and in 2018 and 2019, was listed as the highest-paid YouTuber, earning $22 million and $26 million respectively from his videos and product line.

History
Ryan Kaji's parents Shion and Loann met as undergraduate students at Texas Tech University. Shion moved to the United States from Japan in high school and is the son of a microchip executive. Loann's family fled from Vietnam as refugees, and she grew up in Houston hoping to become a teacher, which she later did. Shion left Texas to get a master's in engineering at Cornell University, but returned soon after Ryan's birth, completing the degree online.

Kaji began making YouTube videos in March 2015 after watching other toy review channels and asking his mother, "How come I'm not on YouTube when all the other kids are?" Kaji's mother decided to quit her job as a high school chemistry teacher to work on the YouTube channel full-time.

Before going live on YouTube, the family replaced their real-life surname with the on-screen surname Kaji. 

In 2017, Kaji's parents signed a deal with PocketWatch, a startup children's media company that was founded in 2016 by Chris Williams and Albie Hecht. PocketWatch does the marketing and merchandise for Ryan's YouTube channels. In 2018, Ryan ToysReview, in cooperation with PocketWatch and WildWorks, created an app called Tag with Ryan, an endless runner game targeted towards children, for iOS and Android. In 2019, Ryan ToysReview and PocketWatch produced a 20-episode television series for preschoolers titled Ryan's Mystery Playdate. On November 1, 2019, Outright Games released a video game titled Race with Ryan, a racing game featuring Kaji and characters from the Ryan's World brand, for PlayStation 4, Xbox One, Nintendo Switch and Microsoft Windows.

The channel announced that they will premiere a hybrid live-action and animated series titled Super Spy Ryan on November 27, 2020, at Amazon Kids+. On December 4, 2020, it was announced that Ryan's World would be launching an official game on the gaming platform Roblox. On 4 March 2022, Outright Games released a second Ryan's World licensed video game titled Ryan’s Rescue Squad, an action-adventure game for PlayStation 4, PlayStation 5, Xbox One, Xbox Series X|S, Nintendo Switch, Microsoft Windows, and Stadia.

Influence
Kaji has impacted the toy industry through the high view counts of his toy reviews, which will sometimes affect toy sales. Chris Williams of PocketWatch compared Kaji to Nickelodeon's SpongeBob SquarePants.

At the Toy Fair 2018 in New York City, Kaji announced a line of toys, branded as Ryan's World, in cooperation with PocketWatch and Bonkers Toys. 
The toys were first released exclusively at Walmart on August 6, 2018.

The Ryan's World channel has been listed in 2018 and 2019 as the highest-earning YouTube channel by Forbes. The New York Times reported that the Kaji family earn at least $25 million from their "Ryan's World" merchandise sales, which totaled over $250 million in 2021. 

The channel's description mentions that most of the toys reviewed are later donated to charity. His mother told Tubefilter that "Ryan doesn't keep all the toys he gets — we give a lot of them away to friends and family, and also a lot of them away to charity."

Controversy 
On August 28, 2019, a complaint was filed by Truth in Advertising and the Federal Trade Commission due to its sponsored videos not being properly disclosed. Truth in Advertising has claimed that "Nearly 90 percent of the Ryan ToysReview videos have included at least one paid product recommendation aimed at preschoolers, a group too young to distinguish between a commercial and a review." These advertisements often depict unhealthy foods. The latter complaint resulted in the FTC suing YouTube and Google for $170 million; this resulted in YouTube adopting new rules on children's content to comply with the Children's Online Privacy Protection Act.

Awards and nominations

See also
Ryan's Mystery Playdate

References

External links

English-language YouTube channels
Toy controversies
YouTube channels launched in 2015
YouTube controversies